Progomphotherium is an extinct genus of large herbivorous mammals that were closely related to elephants.

References

Amebelodontidae
Prehistoric placental genera